Mariya Goricheva was a Russian Empire and Soviet film actress.

Selected filmography 
 1916 — Queen of the Dead
 1918 — Jellyfish Smile
 1934 — Theft of Sight
 1936 — Convict

References

External links 
 Mariya Goricheva on avproduction.am
 Mariya Goricheva on kino-teatr.ru

Actresses from the Russian Empire
Soviet actresses
1887 births
1967 deaths